Border Lord is the third album by Kris Kristofferson, released in 1972 on Monument Records.

Recording and composition
After enjoying enormous success as a songwriter in 1970 and 1971, including Song of the Year awards from both the Country Music Association and Academy of Country Music, Kristofferson’s second album, The Silver Tongued Devil and I, established him as a recording artist in his own right.  However, after having the luxury of honing his compositions over a period of years, he had just a matter of months to write songs for Border Lord.  As noted by AllMusic's William Ruhlmann:

A dominant theme in the songs on Border Lord is the ill treatment of women, with six tunes, including “Josie” and “Little Girl Lost,” concerning females who had become debased in some way, for which the narrator seems to feel some vicarious or personal guilt.  The image of the Devil, already prominent in previous compositions like “The Silver Tongued Devil and I” and “To Beat the Devil,” reappears in five of the songs, giving the collection a desperate, despairing mood overall.  Now in demand as a touring performer, two songs, “Getting’ By, High and Strange” and the title track reflected his current circumstances on the road.

Two songs, “Josie,” and “Burden of Freedom,” mined similar territory thematically as “Me and Bobby McGee,” but when the latter was released as the album’s lone single it only struggled into the lower reaches of the pop charts.

In 2019, Sheryl Crow released her own version of the title track featuring Kristofferson on her album Threads.

Reception
Border Lord was released in February 1972 but failed to achieve the success its predecessors had. At the time of its release, Ben Gerson of Rolling Stone was unkind, charging that Kristofferson was “a fast-livin’, hard lovin’ dude who has just enough time between ballin’ and brawlin’ to jot down a tune or two.  He’s a cracker-barrel philosopher…Kris’ celebrations of machismo are his most patently stupid observations.”  Biographer Stephen Miller opines “While Kris produced some of his affecting poetry with characteristic cleverness, the melodies were unremarkable and with his limited vocal range, a number of the songs suffered from a dirgeful quality.”  AllMusic lamented the rushed gestation of the songs, remarking “No doubt Kristofferson and Monument would have been better advised to have waited until he had a collection of songs to match his early hits; instead, he quickly began work on yet another album, Jesus Was a Capricorn, which was out before the end of the year.”  Writer Michael Streissguth praises the album, maintaining it offered lyrical themes that remained “strongly individualistic and never failed to challenge Nashville’s sensibilities.”  In a 2016 Rolling Stone interview with Neil Strauss, Kristofferson said he was pleasantly surprised with the box set of his work The Complete Monument & Columbia Album Collection, particularly Border Lord, admitting, "I can remember at the time being so disappointed at the reception it got."

Track listing
All songs by Kris Kristofferson except as noted
"Josie" – 3:12
"Burden of Freedom" – 3:22
"Stagger Mountain Tragedy" – 2:53
"Border Lord" (Stephen Bruton, Donnie Fritts, Terry Paul, Kristofferson) – 3:38
"Somebody Nobody Knows" – 3:36
"Little Girl Lost" – 3:10
"Smokey Put the Sweat on Me" – 3:10
"When She's Wrong" – 4:47
"Gettin' By, High and Strange" – 2:37
"Kiss the World Goodbye" – 3:01

Personnel
Kris Kristofferson - vocals, guitar
Rita Coolidge - vocals
Pete Drake - steel guitar
Donnie Fritts - keyboards, background vocals
Dennis Linde - acoustic and electric guitar
Billy Swan - bass, background vocals
Stephen Bruton - acoustic and electric guitar, background vocals
Kenneth A. Buttrey - drums
Jerry Carrigan - drums
Tommy Jackson - fiddle
Jerry Kennedy - guitar
Farrell Morris - percussion
Terry Paul - bass, background vocals
Jerry Shook - acoustic and electric guitar
Benny Whitehead - background vocals
John "Bucky" Wilkin - acoustic and electric guitar
Charlie McCoy - harmonica, organ

Production
Produced by Fred Foster
Tommy Strong, Mort Thomasson, Lou Bradley - engineer
Ed Lee - cover design
Arnold Arnhan - cover artwork
Marian Owen, Janet Madison - back cover photography

Liner notes
 —Kris Kristofferson

Cultural references
In the video game Battlefield: Bad Company, upon facing a difficult situation one of the player character's squad members asks if "Is this as bad as Kris Kristofferson's third album?" upon which another squad member replies affirmatively, referring to Border Lord. The exact quote:
Sweetwater: "This is bad, Hags. Whatever you've done, it's worse."
Haggard: "Worse than Kris Kristofferson's third album?"
Sweetwater: "Bad, worse!"
Haggard: "No WAY!"

Charts

References

1972 albums
Kris Kristofferson albums
Albums produced by Fred Foster
Monument Records albums